Center for Economic and Social Development, or CESD; in Azeri, İqtisadi və Sosial İnkişaf Mərkəzi (İSİM) is an Azeri think tank, non-profit organization, NGO based in Baku, Azerbaijan. The Center was established in 2005.

CESD focuses on policy advocacy and reform, and is involved with policy research and capacity building. CESD involves leading researchers prominent in their fields and enjoys a broad regional and international networking.

CESD ranked as one of the top think tanks in the world by The University of Pennsylvania, United States in Global "Go-To Think Tanks" Report in 2010. According to the University of Pennsylvania rankings - a result of surveys from 1500 scholars and peer review evaluation - the Center for Economic and Social Development (CESD) is one of the top 25 think tanks in Central and Eastern Europe, including CIS. CESD is the only think tank from the Caucasus and Central Asia included in the top think tanks rankings.
 
CESD is also ranked as one of the top 25 domestic economic policy thinks tanks in the world. Only CESD (ranked 19) and the Center for Social and Economic Research (CASE), (Poland, ranked 21) were included in the list from Central and Eastern Europe and CIS countries.

Mission
CESD has been set up to promote research into domestic and regional economic and social issues, advocacy towards reforms and capacity building for the purpose to positively impact the policy making and improve the participation.

The focus
The Center is a leading Azerbaijani think tank specialized in economic and social policy issues working with and establishing bridge between the government and the various representatives of civil society. At the same time, the Center positions itself in the center of the civil society having tight relationships with media, 24 communities spread around Azerbaijan, NGOs providing services at the grass-root level, international think-tanks, financial institutions and donors, and virtually all the other think tanks functioning in Azerbaijan.

Goals
Policy advice and advocacy
Government and civil society capacity development
Public awareness, interest in involvement and participation in policy programs and reforms
Anticorruption reforms, mechanisms, programs and tools at the policy and grassroots levels
Understanding and application of market economy principles and values  in Azerbaijan and the region
Cooperation between educational institutions and public, private and NGO sectors in addressing the economic and social issues
Research and programs to address sustainable development, as well as the issues on women’s rights protection, poverty reduction, Millennium Development Goals and economic and social reforms

Management
Chairman of CESD is Vugar Bayramov, well-known economist in Azerbaijan. He has Ph.D. in economics from Washington University in St. Louis. The center Board consists of 5 economists and social-work specialists and all of them almunues from different US universities.

Publications
Ending Dependency: How Is Oil Revenues Effectively Used in Azerbaijan?
Audit in Local Government
Modern Economics
Reforms in Public Administration; Policy Recommendation
Health Economics
Strategy of State Oil Fund (Policy Paper)
Azerbaijan’s Accession to the WTO (Policy Paper)
Gender Economics; “Brain Lost” Problem in Azerbaijan (Policy Paper)
Political Credibility; why investments go to the oil sector (Policy Paper)
Why 90% of investments go to oil sector? (Policy Paper)
Oil Revenues; Transparency, Effectiveness and Accountability (Policy Paper)
Investment Strategy in Business Sector (Policy Paper)
Social insurance in Azerbaijan: diagnostics and recommendations on policy and implementation

Membership
CESD is a member of PASOS, CIVICUS World Citizen’s Alliance, Global Development Network, NISPAcee, etc. and local partner of Global Integrity.

References

https://web.archive.org/web/20110716095309/http://www.gdnet.org/cms.php?id=organization_details&organization_id=3845
http://www.idealist.org/if/i/en/av/Org/152558-113
https://web.archive.org/web/20090131232059/http://pasos.org/www-pasosmembers-org/news/think-tanks-from-azerbaijan-czech-republic-and-georgia-join-pasos-network
http://web.worldbank.org/WBSITE/EXTERNAL/WBI/EXTSOCACCDEMSIDEGOV/0,,contentMDK:21241045~menuPK:2872101~pagePK:64168445~piPK:64168309~theSitePK:2872075,00.html
https://web.archive.org/web/20100613012612/http://socialinnovationexchange.org/node/1222
https://www.ammado.eu
http://edirc.repec.org/data/cesddaz.html
http://www.worldpress.org/library/ngo.cfm
http://www.nira.or.jp/past/ice/nwdtt/2005/DAT/1446.html

External links
 The Center for Economic and Social Development
 A Comparative Analysis of CIS Countries' WTO Accession, by CESD Director, World Bank paper
 CESD book, Ending Dependency on Hydrocarbon Resources
 CESD Strategy for State Oil Fund of Azerbaijan Republic
 Dövlət Neft Fondunun Sərəncamındakı Vəsaitlərin Səmərəli İstifadəsi, in Azeri
 Using Oil Revenues Effectively In Azerbaijan
 Political Credibility and Economic Development: A Case of Azerbaijan
 Public Expenditure Tracking; Increasing of Role of Communities and Municipalities. Vugar Bayramov (Ph.D.) Chairman of CESD
 Anti-corruption Initiatives in Oil Sector in Azerbaijan By Vugar Bayramov, CESD 

Think tanks based in Azerbaijan
2005 establishments in Azerbaijan
Research institutes established in 2005
Research institutes in Azerbaijan
Economy of Azerbaijan